Kul Nesîmî, or simply Nesîmî, real name Ali was an Ottoman Alevi-Bektashi poet, who lived in the 17th century in Anatolia.

Very little is known about this poet except that certain political events found an expression in his poetry, such as Ottoman conquest of Baghdad in 1640. He wrote in the same tradition as such earlier poets as Nasimi, with whom he is frequently confused, as well as in the tradition of Khatai and Pir Sultan Abdal.

References

Poetry by Kul Nesîmî
Article in the newspaper Milliyet on Kul Nesîmî 
Ben Melamet Hırkasını - Alevi-Bektaşi Halk (Semah ve Deyish)

External links

Turkish Alevis
17th-century poets from the Ottoman Empire
Turkish-language poets
Turkish-language singers
17th-century births
Year of death unknown
Turkish Muslims
Ottoman Sufis
Turkish Sufis
Bektashi Order
Male poets from the Ottoman Empire
17th-century male writers